The P. D. Burton House is a historic house at 305 Chestnut Street in Lewisville, Arkansas.  The two-story wood-frame house was built in 1916 for Percy Duffield Burtun, and is an excellent local example of American Craftsman architecture.  Its features include a jerkinhead roof with exposed rafter ends, and a porch supported by large brick piers and large brackets.

The house was listed on the National Register of Historic Places in 1998.

See also
National Register of Historic Places listings in Lafayette County, Arkansas

References

Houses on the National Register of Historic Places in Arkansas
Houses in Lafayette County, Arkansas
National Register of Historic Places in Lafayette County, Arkansas